Ben Bakeberg (born July 15, 1978) is an American politician serving in the Minnesota House of Representatives since 2023. A member of the Republican Party of Minnesota, Bakeberg represents District 54B south of the Twin Cities metropolitan area, which includes the city of Prior Lake and parts of Scott County, Minnesota.

Early life, education and career 
Bakeberg received his bachelor of science degree in elementary education from the University of Northwestern - St. Paul, and his masters in science in education leadership from Minnesota State University Mankato.

Minnesota House of Representatives 
Bakeberg was elected to the Minnesota House of Representatives in 2022. He first ran after redistricting and after five-term Republican incumbent Tony Albright announced he would not seek reelection and resigned. Bakeberg serves on the Education Finance and Education Policy Committees.

Electoral history

Personal life 
Bakeberg lives in Jordan, Minnesota with his wife, Lindy, and has three children.

References

External links 

 Official House of Representatives website
 Official campaign website

Living people
1978 births
Republican Party members of the Minnesota House of Representatives
21st-century American politicians
University of Northwestern – St. Paul alumni
Minnesota State University, Mankato alumni
People from Jordan, Minnesota